Peyerl is a German surname. Notable people with the name include:
Paul Peyerl, 16th-century German musician and repairer
Martin Peyerl, 16-year old German student, perpetrator of the Bad Reichenhall shootings

German-language surnames